UFC 9: Motor City Madness was a mixed martial arts event held by the Ultimate Fighting Championship on May 17, 1996,  at the Cobo Arena in Detroit, Michigan.  The event was seen live on pay-per-view in the United States, and later released on home video.

History
UFC 9 was the first UFC production not to feature the tournament format (which was brought back by popular demand at UFC 10). Instead, it featured an entire card of regular bouts. The card featured seven bouts and an alternate bout to fill time for the pay-per-view broadcast.

The main event was the highly anticipated rematch between reigning UFC Superfight Champion Ken Shamrock and number one contender Dan Severn, who had fought one year earlier at UFC 6 for the UFC Superfight Championship, with Shamrock reigning victorious.

The UFC drew national criticism leading up to the event, due in large part to Arizona Senator John McCain's letter writing campaign against the "brutal spectacle" of no holds barred fighting. After a legal battle in the Detroit courts up until 4:30 p.m. on the day of the show, the UFC was allowed to continue, but with modified rules.

The special rules included no closed fisted strikes to the head and no headbutts – a rule that referee John McCarthy attempted to enforce, but with little success. Before the show, fighters were warned not to use closed fisted strikes under penalty of arrest. Although many fights that night included closed fisted striking, no fighters were arrested.

Due in part to this special rule, the Superfight between Dan Severn and Ken Shamrock is widely considered one of the worst MMA fights of all time, with the fighters circling each other for nearly 20 minutes with little or no contact.

Aftermath

Following the legal battle over UFC 9, Senator John McCain was successful in pulling UFC pay-per-view broadcasts from numerous cable systems, including TCI cable, which greatly hurt pay-per-view buy rates.

Results

See also 
 Ultimate Fighting Championship
 List of UFC champions
 List of UFC events
 1996 in UFC

References

External links
UFC 9 Results from Sherdog.com
UFC 9 fights reviews
Official UFC website
UFC History - Severn vs. Shamrock 2: what really happened at UFC 9

Ultimate Fighting Championship events
1996 in mixed martial arts
Mixed martial arts in Michigan
Sports competitions in Detroit
1996 in sports in Michigan
Events in Detroit